Titanium dioxide, also known as titanium(IV) oxide or titania , is the inorganic compound with the chemical formula . When used as a pigment, it is called titanium white, Pigment White 6 (PW6), or CI 77891.  It is a white solid that is insoluble in water, although mineral forms can appear black. As a pigment, it has a wide range of applications, including paint, sunscreen, and food coloring. When used as a food coloring, it has E number E171. World production in 2014 exceeded 9 million tonnes. It has been estimated that titanium dioxide is used in two-thirds of all pigments, and pigments based on the oxide have been valued at a price of $13.2 billion.

Structure
In all three of its main dioxides, titanium exhibits octahedral geometry, being bonded to six oxide anions.  The oxides in turn are bonded to three Ti centers.  The overall crystal structure of rutile is tetragonal in symmetry whereas anatase and brookite are orthorhombic. The oxygen substructures are all slight distortions of close packing: in rutile, the oxide anions are arranged in distorted hexagonal close-packing, whereas they are close to cubic close-packing in anatase and to "double hexagonal close-packing" for brookite. The rutile structure is widespread for other metal dioxides and difluorides, e.g. RuO2 and ZnF2.

Molten titanium dioxide has a local structure in which each Ti is coordinated to, on average, about 5 oxygen atoms. This is distinct from the crystalline forms in which Ti coordinates to 6 oxygen atoms.

Production and occurrence
Synthetic TiO2 is mainly produced from the mineral ilmenite.  Rutile, and anatase, naturally occurring TiO2, occur widely also, e.g. rutile as a 'heavy mineral' in beach sand. Leucoxene, fine-grained anatase formed by natural alteration of ilmenite, is yet another ore. Star sapphires and rubies get their asterism from oriented inclusions of rutile needles.

Mineralogy and uncommon polymorphs
Titanium dioxide occurs in nature as the minerals rutile and anatase.  Additionally two high-pressure forms are known minerals: a monoclinic baddeleyite-like form known as akaogiite, and the other has a slight monoclinic distortion of the orthorhombic α-PbO2 structure and is known as riesite. Both of which can be found at the Ries crater in Bavaria. It is mainly sourced from ilmenite, which is the most widespread titanium dioxide-bearing ore around the world. Rutile is the next most abundant and contains around 98% titanium dioxide in the ore. The metastable anatase and brookite phases convert irreversibly to the equilibrium rutile phase upon heating above temperatures in the range .

Titanium dioxide has twelve known polymorphs – in addition to rutile, anatase, brookite, akaogiite and riesite, three metastable phases can be produced synthetically (monoclinic, tetragonal, and orthorhombic ramsdellite-like), and four high-pressure forms (α-PbO2-like, cotunnite-like, orthorhombic OI, and cubic phases) also exist:

The cotunnite-type phase was claimed to be the hardest known oxide with the Vickers hardness of 38 GPa and the bulk modulus of 431 GPa (i.e. close to diamond's value of 446 GPa) at atmospheric pressure. However, later studies came to different conclusions with much lower values for both the hardness (7–20 GPa, which makes it softer than common oxides like corundum Al2O3 and rutile TiO2) and bulk modulus (~300 GPa).

Titanium dioxide (B) is found as a mineral in magmatic rocks and hydrothermal veins, as well as weathering rims on perovskite. TiO2 also forms lamellae in other minerals.

Production

The five largest  pigment processors are in 2019 Chemours, Cristal Global, Venator, and Tronox. Major paint and coating company end users for pigment grade titanium dioxide include Akzo Nobel, PPG Industries, Sherwin Williams, BASF, Kansai Paints and Valspar. Global  pigment demand for 2010 was 5.3 Mt with annual growth expected to be about 3–4%.

The production method depends on the feedstock.  In addition to ores, other feedstocks include upgraded slag. Both sulfate and chloride processes produce the titanium dioxide pigment in the rutile crystal form, but the Sulfate Process can be adjusted to produce the anatase form. Anatase, being softer, is used in fiber and paper applications. The Sulfate Process is run as a batch process; the Chloride Process is run as a continuous process.

Chloride process
In chloride process, the ore is treated with chlorine and carbon to give titanium tetrachloride, a volatile liquid that is further purified by distillation.  The TiCl4 is treated with oxygen to regenerate chlorine and produce the titanium dioxide.

Sulfate process
Chemical manufacturing plants using the sulfate process, require ilmenite concentrate (45–60% TiO2) or pretreated feedstocks as a suitable source of titanium. In the sulfate process, ilmenite is treated with sulfuric acid to extract iron(II) sulfate pentahydrate. The resulting synthetic rutile is further processed according to the specifications of the end user, i.e. pigment grade or otherwise. In another method for the production of synthetic rutile from ilmenite the Becher process first oxidizes the ilmenite as a means to separate the iron component.

Specialized methods
For specialty applications, TiO2 films are prepared by various specialized chemistries. Sol-gel routes involve the hydrolysis of titanium alkoxides, such as titanium ethoxide:
Ti(OEt)4 + 2 H2O → TiO2 + 4 EtOH
This technology is suited for the preparation of films. A related approach that also relies on molecular precursors involves chemical vapor deposition. In this application, the alkoxide is volatilized and then decomposed on contact with a hot surface:
Ti(OEt)4 → TiO2 + 2 Et2O

Applications
The most important application areas are paints and varnishes as well as paper and plastics, which account for about 80% of the world's titanium dioxide consumption. Other pigment applications such as printing inks, fibers, rubber, cosmetic products, and food account for another 8%. The rest is used in other applications, for instance the production of technical pure titanium, glass and glass ceramics, electrical ceramics, metal patinas, catalysts, electric conductors, chemical intermediates, or as a substrate for phosphonic acid adsorption.

Pigment

First mass-produced in 1916, titanium dioxide is the most widely used white pigment because of its brightness and very high refractive index, in which it is surpassed only by a few other materials (see list of indices of refraction). Titanium dioxide crystal size is ideally around 220 nm (measured by electron microscope) to optimize the maximum reflection of visible light. However, abnormal grain growth is often observed in titanium dioxide, particularly in its rutile phase. The occurrence of abnormal grain growth brings about a deviation of a small number of crystallites from the mean crystal size and modifies the physical behaviour of TiO2. The optical properties of the finished pigment are highly sensitive to purity. As little as a few parts per million (ppm) of certain metals (Cr, V, Cu, Fe, Nb) can disturb the crystal lattice so much that the effect can be detected in quality control. Approximately 4.6 million tons of pigmentary TiO2 are used annually worldwide, and this number is expected to increase as use continues to rise.

TiO2 is also an effective opacifier in powder form, where it is employed as a pigment to provide whiteness and opacity to products such as paints, coatings, plastics, papers, inks, foods, supplements, medicines (i.e. pills and tablets), and most toothpastes; in 2019 it was present in two-thirds of toothpastes on the French market. In food, it is commonly found in products like ice creams, chocolates, all types of candy, creamers, desserts, marshmallows, chewing gum, pastries, spreads, dressings, cakes, and many other foods. In paint, it is often referred to offhandedly as "brilliant white", "the perfect white", "the whitest white", or other similar terms. Opacity is improved by optimal sizing of the titanium dioxide particles.

Thin films
When deposited as a thin film, its refractive index and colour make it an excellent reflective optical coating for dielectric mirrors; it is also used in generating decorative thin films such as found in "mystic fire topaz".

Some grades of modified titanium based pigments as used in sparkly paints, plastics, finishes and cosmetics – these are man-made pigments whose particles have two or more layers of various oxides – often titanium dioxide, iron oxide or alumina – in order to have glittering, iridescent and or pearlescent effects similar to crushed mica or guanine-based products. In addition to these effects a limited colour change is possible in certain formulations depending on how and at which angle the finished product is illuminated and the thickness of the oxide layer in the pigment particle; one or more colours appear by reflection while the other tones appear due to interference of the transparent titanium dioxide layers. In some products, the layer of titanium dioxide is grown in conjunction with iron oxide by calcination of titanium salts (sulfates, chlorates) around 800 °C One example of a pearlescent pigment is Iriodin, based on mica coated with titanium dioxide or iron (III) oxide.

The iridescent effect in these titanium oxide particles is unlike the opaque effect obtained with usual ground titanium oxide pigment obtained by mining, in which case only a certain diameter of the particle is considered and the effect is due only to scattering.

Sunscreen and UV blocking pigments
In cosmetic and skin care products, titanium dioxide is used as a pigment, sunscreen and a thickener. As a sunscreen, ultrafine TiO2 is used, which is notable in that combined with ultrafine zinc oxide, it is considered to be an effective sunscreen that lowers the incidence of sun burns and minimizes the premature photoaging, photocarcinogenesis and immunosuppression associated with long term excess sun exposure. Sometimes these UV blockers are combined with iron oxide pigments in sunscreen to increase visible light protection.

Titanium dioxide and zinc oxide are generally considered to be less harmful to coral reefs than sunscreens that include chemicals such as oxybenzone, octocrylene and octinoxate.

Nanosized titanium dioxide is found in the majority of physical sunscreens because of its strong UV light absorbing capabilities and its resistance to discolouration under ultraviolet light. This advantage enhances its stability and ability to protect the skin from ultraviolet light. Nano-scaled (particle size of 20–40 nm) titanium dioxide particles are primarily used in sunscreen lotion because they scatter visible light much less than titanium dioxide pigments, and can give UV protection. Sunscreens designed for infants or people with sensitive skin are often based on titanium dioxide and/or zinc oxide, as these mineral UV blockers are believed to cause less skin irritation than other UV absorbing chemicals. Nano-TiO2 blocks both UV-A and UV-B radiation, which is used in sunscreens and other cosmetic products. It is safe to use and it is better to environment than organic UV-absorbers.

The risk assessment of different titanium dioxide nanomaterials in sunscreen is currently evolving as nano-sized TiO2 is different from the well-known micronized form. The rutile form is generally used in cosmetic and sunscreen products due to it not possessing any observed ability to damage the skin under normal conditions and having a higher UV absorption. In 2016 Scientific Committee on Consumer Safety (SCCS) tests concluded that the use of nano titanium dioxide (95–100% rutile, ≦5% anatase) as a UV filter can be considered to not pose any risk of adverse effects in humans post-application on healthy skin, except in the case the application method would lead to substantial risk of inhalation (ie; powder or spray formulations). This safety opinion applied to nano TiO2 in concentrations of up to 25%.

Initial studies indicated that nano-TiO2 particles could penetrate the skin causing concern over the use of nano-TiO2. These studies were later refuted, when it was discovered that the testing methodology couldn't differentiate between penetrated particles and particles simply trapped in hair follicles and that having a diseased or physically damaged dermis could be the true cause of insufficient barrier protection.

SCCS research found that when nanoparticles had certain photostable coatings (eg. alumina, silica, cetyl phosphate, triethoxycaprylylsilane, manganese dioxide) the photocatalytic activity was attenuated and no notable skin penetration was observed; the sunscreen in this research was applied at amounts of 10 mg/cm2 for exposure periods of 24 hours. Coating TiO2 with alumina, silica, zircon or various polymers can minimize avobenzone degradation and enhance UV absorption by adding an additional light diffraction mechanism.

 is used extensively in plastics and other applications as a white pigment or an opacifier and for its UV resistant properties where the powder disperses light – unlike organic UV absorbers – and reduces UV damage, due mostly to the particle's high refractive index.

Other uses of titanium dioxide
In ceramic glazes, titanium dioxide acts as an opacifier and seeds crystal formation.

It is used as a tattoo pigment and in styptic pencils. Titanium dioxide is produced in varying particle sizes which are both oil and water dispersible, and in certain grades for the cosmetic industry. It is also a common ingredient in toothpaste.

The exterior of the Saturn V rocket was painted with titanium dioxide; this later allowed astronomers to determine that J002E3 was likely the S-IVB stage from Apollo 12 and not an asteroid.

Research

Photocatalyst
Nanosized titanium dioxide, particularly in the anatase form, exhibits photocatalytic activity under ultraviolet (UV) irradiation. This photoactivity is reportedly most pronounced at the {001} planes of anatase, although the {101} planes are thermodynamically more stable and thus more prominent in most synthesised and natural anatase, as evident by the often observed tetragonal dipyramidal growth habit. Interfaces between rutile and anatase are further considered to improve photocatalytic activity by facilitating charge carrier separation and as a result, biphasic titanium dioxide is often considered to possess enhanced functionality as a photocatalyst. It has been reported that titanium dioxide, when doped with nitrogen ions or doped with metal oxide like tungsten trioxide, exhibits excitation also under visible light. The strong oxidative potential of the positive holes oxidizes water to create hydroxyl radicals. It can also oxidize oxygen or organic materials directly. Hence, in addition to its use as a pigment, titanium dioxide can be added to paints, cements, windows, tiles, or other products for its sterilizing, deodorizing, and anti-fouling properties, and is used as a hydrolysis catalyst. It is also used in dye-sensitized solar cells, which are a type of chemical solar cell (also known as a Graetzel cell).

The photocatalytic properties of nanosized titanium dioxide were discovered by Akira Fujishima in 1967 and published in 1972. The process on the surface of the titanium dioxide was called the Honda-Fujishima effect (:ja:本多-藤嶋効果). Titanium dioxide, in thin film and nanoparticle form has potential for use in energy production: as a photocatalyst, it can break water into hydrogen and oxygen. With the hydrogen collected, it could be used as a fuel. The efficiency of this process can be greatly improved by doping the oxide with carbon. Further efficiency and durability has been obtained by introducing disorder to the lattice structure of the surface layer of titanium dioxide nanocrystals, permitting infrared absorption. Visible-light-active nanosized anatase and rutile has been developed for photocatalytic applications.

In 1995 Fujishima and his group discovered the superhydrophilicity phenomenon for titanium dioxide coated glass exposed to sun light. This resulted in the development of self-cleaning glass and anti-fogging coatings.

Nanosized TiO2 incorporated into outdoor building materials, such as paving stones in noxer blocks or paints, could reduce concentrations of airborne pollutants such as volatile organic compounds and nitrogen oxides.A TiO2-containing cement has been produced.

Using TiO2 as a photocatalyst, attempts have been made to mineralize pollutants (to convert into CO2 and H2O) in waste water. The photocatalytic destruction of organic matter could also be exploited in coatings with antimicrobial applications.

Hydroxyl radical formation
Although nanosized anatase TiO2 does not absorb visible light, it does strongly absorb ultraviolet (UV) radiation (hv), leading to the formation of hydroxyl radicals. This occurs when photo-induced valence bond holes (h+vb) are trapped at the surface of TiO2 leading to the formation of trapped holes (h+tr) that cannot oxidize water.
TiO2 + hv → e− + h+vb
h+vb → h+tr
O2 + e− → O2•−
O2•− + O2•−+ 2 → H2O2 + O2
O2•− + h+vb → O2
O2•− + h+tr → O2
 + h+vb → HO•
e− + h+tr → recombination
Note: Wavelength (λ)= 387 nm This reaction has been found to mineralize and decompose undesirable compounds in the environment, specifically the air and in wastewater.

Nanotubes

Anatase can be converted into non-carbon nanotubes and nanowires. Hollow TiO2 nanofibers can be also prepared by coating carbon nanofibers by first applying titanium butoxide.

Health and safety
As of 2006, titanium dioxide has been regarded as "completely nontoxic."  Widely occurring minerals and even gemstones are composed of TiO2.  All natural titanium, comprising more than 0.5% of the earth's crust, exists as oxides.  Although no evidence points to acute toxicity, recurring concerns have been expressed about nanophase forms of these materials. Studies of workers with high exposure to TiO2 particles indicate that even at high exposure there is no adverse effect to human health.

The European Union removed the authorisation to use titanium dioxide (E 171) in foods, effective 7 February 2022, with a six months grace period.

Titanium dioxide dust, when inhaled, has been classified by the International Agency for Research on Cancer (IARC) as an IARC Group 2B carcinogen, meaning it is possibly carcinogenic to humans. 
The US National Institute for Occupational Safety and Health recommends two separate exposure limits. NIOSH recommends that fine  particles be set at an exposure limit of 2.4 mg/m3, while ultrafine  be set at an exposure limit of 0.3 mg/m3, as time-weighted average concentrations up to 10 hours a day for a 40-hour work week.

Environmental waste introduction
Titanium dioxide (TiO₂) is mostly introduced into the environment as nanoparticles via wastewater treatment plants. Cosmetic pigments including titanium dioxide enter the wastewater when the product is washed off into sinks after cosmetic use. Once in the sewage treatment plants, pigments separate into sewage sludge which can then be released into the soil when injected into the soil or distributed on its surface. 99% of these nanoparticles wind up on land rather than in aquatic environments due to their retention in sewage sludge. In the environment, titanium dioxide nanoparticles have low to negligible solubility and have been shown to be stable once particle aggregates are formed in soil and water surroundings. In the process of dissolution, water-soluble ions typically dissociate from the nanoparticle into solution when thermodynamically unstable. TiO2 dissolution increases when there are higher levels of dissolved organic matter and clay in the soil. However, aggregation is promoted by pH at the isoelectric point of TiO2 (pH= 5.8) which renders it neutral and solution ion concentrations above 4.5 mM.

National policies on food additive use 
TiO2 whitener in food was banned in France from 2020, due to uncertainty about what quantities were safe for human consumption.

In 2021, the European Food Safety Authority (EFSA) ruled that as a consequence of new understandings of nanoparticles, titanium dioxide could "no longer be considered safe as a food additive", and the EU health commissioner announced plans to ban its use across the EU, with discussions beginning in June 2021. EFSA concluded that genotoxicity—which could lead to carcinogenic effects—could not be ruled out, and that a "safe level for daily intake of the food additive could not be established". In 2022, the UK Food Standards Agency and Food Standards Scotland announced they disagreed with the EFSA ruling, and would therefore not follow the EU in banning titanium dioxide as a food additive. Health Canada has similarly reviewed the available evidence and decided not to change their position on titanium dioxide as a food additive at this time.

Research as an ingestible nanomaterial
Due to the potential that long-term ingestion of titanium dioxide may be toxic, particularly to cells and functions of the gastrointestinal tract, preliminary research is assessing its possible role in disease development, such as inflammatory bowel disease and colorectal cancer, as of 2021.

Culture and society 

Companies such as Dunkin' Donuts dropped titanium dioxide from their merchandise in 2015 after public pressure. Andrew Maynard, director of Risk Science Center at the University of Michigan, rejected the supposed danger from use of titanium dioxide in food. He says that the titanium dioxide used by Dunkin' Brands and many other food producers is not a new material, and it is not a nanomaterial either. Nanoparticles are typically smaller than 100 nanometres in diameter, yet most of the particles in food grade titanium dioxide are much larger.
Still, size distribution analyses showed that batches of food-grade TiO₂ always include a nano-sized fraction as inevitable byproduct of the manufacturing processes.

See also
Delustrant
Dye-sensitized solar cell
List of inorganic pigments
Noxer blocks, TiO2-coated pavers that remove  pollutants from the air
Suboxide
Surface properties of transition metal oxides
Titanium dioxide nanoparticle

References

External links

International Chemical Safety Card 0338

NIOSH Pocket Guide to Chemical Hazards
The Largest TiO2 Distributor in China Interview with Chairman Yang Tao by ICOAT.CC.
"Fresh doubt over America map", bbc.co.uk, 30 July 2002
"Titanium Dioxide Classified as Possibly Carcinogenic to Humans", Canadian Centre for Occupational Health and Safety, August, 2006 (if inhaled as a powder)
A description of TiO2 photocatalysis
Crystal structures of the three forms of TiO2
"Architecture in Italy goes green", Elisabetta Povoledo, International Herald Tribune, 22 November 2006
"A Concrete Step Toward Cleaner Air", Bruno Giussani, BusinessWeek.com, 8 November 2006
Sunscreen in the Sky? Reflective Particles May Combat Warming
Titanium and titanium dioxide production data (US and World)

Dye-sensitized solar cells
E-number additives
Excipients
Food colorings
IARC Group 2B carcinogens
Inorganic pigments
Sunscreening agents
Titanium(IV) compounds
Transition metal oxides